The 1000 Islands Tower is a concrete observation tower, on Hill Island, in Ontario, about 620 meters from the border of New York State.

It is generally open from May to October.

See also
List of tallest structures in Canada

References

External links

Thousand Islands
Tourist attractions in Ontario
Observation towers in Canada